Sipaliwini is the largest district of Suriname, located in the south. Sipaliwini is the only district that does not have a regional capital, as it is directly administered by the national government in Paramaribo.

History
Sipaliwini was created in 1983 and has a population of 37,065 and an area of  The district is nearly 4 times as large as the other 9 districts of Suriname combined; however, most of the Sipaliwini is almost completely covered by rainforest. Various peace treaties starting in 1686 had recognised autonomy for the tribes over their own area; however, a specific delineation of the tribal area had been lacking. The name is of Indigenous origin, refers to the Sipaliwini River, and means "river of stones or rocks".

It is thought by archaeologists that hunter-gatherers lived in what is today Sipaliwini district during the Paleolithic period. The region was largely left alone during the colonial period, as the Dutch that controlled Suriname were fearful of the Portuguese in Brazil, and it was not until the 20th century that development projects began.

As of 2004, there are 41 schools in the areas. An increase in schools is planned, because some children have to travel long distances by foot or boat to neighbouring villages. As of 2004, there are 24 clinics in the district. Medical care is provided by Medische Zending. In the 1950s, Operation Grasshopper established many tiny airstrips in the district in order to make the territory accessible.

Sipaliwini district had seen occasional fighting in the late 1960s between Guyanese and Surinamese troops over border disputes in the south-west Tigri Area of the Coeroeni resort.

Nature

Sipaliwini consists of large areas of tropical rain forests, mountains, and savannas. In 1998, the Central Suriname Nature Reserve was created by Conservation International and the government of Suriname from the fusion of three existing nature reserves: Ralleighvallen, Tafelberg and Eilerts de Haangebergte. It was designated a UNESCO World Heritage Site in 2000 for its pristine tropical rainforest ecosystem. It is known for its rapids and bird species, including the Guiana Cock of the Rock (Rupicola rupicola). Over 5,000 different plants have been identified, and large mammals like the jaguar, giant armadillo, and eight species of primates. A research station is located at the foot of Voltzberg and the area is tourist attraction.

The reserve is near pristine and offers a wide variety in flora and fauna.

The Tumuk Humak Mountains are located in the southeastern part of the district, along the border with French Guiana.

Administration 
Until 2011, Sipaliwini was administered by one district commissioner residing in Paramaribo. In the years since, district commissioners have been appointed for each separate resort.

Resorts 

Sipaliwini is divided into 7 resorts (ressorten):

Villages

The district contains 156 villages. All of them except for Stoelmanseiland, Villa Brazil, and Antonio do Brinco are tribal.

 Abenaston
 Alalapadu
 Amatopo
 Antonio do Brinco
 Apetina
 Apoera
 Asidonhopo
 Aurora
 Bakhuys
 Benzdorp
 Bitagron
 Botopasi
 Corneliskondre
 Cottica
 Diitabiki
 Godo Holo
 Jaw Jaw
 Kajana
 Kasuela (disputed)
 Kawemhakan
 Kuruni
 Kwamalasamutu
 Kumakahpan
 Langatabiki
 Lensidede
 Lokaloka
 Lucie
 Manlobi
 Moitaki
 Nieuw Jacobkondre
 Paloemeu
 Pelelu Tepu
 Pikin Slee
 Pïleike
 Poeketi
 Poeloegoedoe
 Poesoegroenoe
 Pokigron
 Sandlanding
 Sipaliwini Savanna
 Snesiekondre
 Stoelmanseiland
 Tutu Kampu
 Vier Gebroeders
 Villa Brazil
 Wanapan
 Washabo

References

External links

 
Districts of Suriname